Events in the year 2021 in Bahrain.

Incumbents
 Monarch: Hamad bin Isa Al Khalifa
 Prime Minister: Salman bin Hamad bin Isa Al Khalifa

Events
Ongoing — COVID-19 pandemic in Bahrain

Deaths
19 February – Faisal Abdulaziz, footballer (born 1968).

References

 

 
2020s in Bahrain
Years of the 21st century in Bahrain
Bahrain
Bahrain